Machchhindrakhed is a small village in Shegaon tehsil of Buldhana district of Maharashtra, India.  It is quite famous in the locality for the goddess temple there.  Jalamb Junction is the nearest railway station.

Villages in Buldhana district